Filipe Bartolomeu Maio (born 6 January 1999) is a Portuguese footballer who plays for São João de Ver as a defender.

Football career
He made his professional debut for Cova da Piedade on 21 January 2021 in the Liga Portugal 2.

References

External links

1999 births
People from Aveiro, Portugal
Sportspeople from Aveiro District
Living people
Portuguese footballers
Association football defenders
G.D. Gafanha players
C.D. Cova da Piedade players
U.D. Oliveirense players
SC São João de Ver players
Liga Portugal 2 players